Andrey Alexandrovich Solomennikov (born 10 June 1987 in Ustinov) is a Russian former professional cyclist, who rode professionally between 2008 and 2017, for the ,  and  teams. He was named in the start list for the 2016 Giro d'Italia.

Major results

2005
 2nd  Road race, UEC European Junior Road Championships
 2nd Overall Giro di Basilicata
2007
 1st Gran Premio San Giuseppe
 10th Overall Grand Prix du Portugal
2008
 4th Overall Grand Prix du Portugal
 10th Overall Five Rings of Moscow
2009
 10th Overall Mi-Août en Bretagne
2010
 8th Grand Prix de la ville de Nogent-sur-Oise
2011
 1st Coppa della Pace
 3rd Overall Circuit des Ardennes
 4th Overall Five Rings of Moscow
1st Prologue
2012
 1st Overall Tour du Loir-et-Cher
 4th Overall Circuit des Ardennes
1st Stage 3 (TTT)
 6th La Roue Tourangelle
2013
 3rd Road race, National Road Championships
2014
 1st Overall Five Rings of Moscow
 1st Memorial Oleg Dyachenko
 8th Overall Grand Prix of Sochi
2015
 1st Krasnodar–Anapa
 3rd Overall Five Rings of Moscow
 3rd Sochi Cup
 4th Duo Normand (with Sergey Nikolaev)
 6th Memorial Oleg Dyachenko
2016
 4th Gran Premio di Lugano

Grand Tour general classification results timeline

References

External links

1987 births
Living people
Russian male cyclists
Sportspeople from Izhevsk